The Suspensory Act 1914 (4 & 5 Geo. 5 c. 88) was an Act of the Parliament of the United Kingdom which suspended the coming into force of two other Acts: the Welsh Church Act 1914 (for the disestablishment of the Church of England in Wales), and the Government of Ireland Act 1914 (Third Home Rule Bill for Ireland).  The Suspensory Act received the royal assent on the same day as the two Acts it suspended, on 18 September 1914.

Background
Welsh disestablishment and Irish home rule were both major policies of H. H. Asquith's Liberal government that had met with considerable controversy and parliamentary opposition in the 1910s.  By the summer of 1914, however, the enactment of both measures seemed inevitable as the provisions set out by the Parliament Act 1911 had been met, allowing the Government to force them through, despite the opposition of the House of Lords, if it so chose.

Upon the outbreak of war with Germany, the government had agreed a "political truce" with the opposition Conservative leader, Bonar Law.  Asquith decided, however, that the two controversial bills should nevertheless be put to the King, together with a new bill suspending their operation; this prompted Law to lead a Unionist walk-out from the House of Commons.

All three bills received the King's assent on the same day, 18 September.

Effect of the Suspensory Act
A short Act with only one substantive section, the Suspensory Act provided that "no steps shall be taken to put [the Government of Ireland Act] into operation", and that the "date of disestablishment" as defined by the Welsh Church Act would be postponed, until 18 September 1915; if the war were still under way at that time, the Government were empowered to push the two Acts' suspension further back.

On 14 September 1915 an Order in Council made under the Suspensory Act suspended the Government of Ireland Act for a further six months (i.e. until 18 March 1916), and postponed Welsh disestablishment until the end of the war.  A subsequent series of Orders in Council, dated 29 February 1916, 7 September 1916, 13 March 1917, 22 August 1917, 27 February 1918, 4 September 1918, 12 March 1919, 18 August 1919, 2 March 1920, and 13 August 1920 suspended the Irish Act in further blocks of six months until the Government of Ireland Act 1920 (passed 23 December 1920) repealed the 1914 Home Rule Act.  However, the 1920 Act was never fully implemented either, due to the Irish War of Independence (culminating in the independence from the United Kingdom of most of Ireland as the Irish Free State); home rule was only established in Northern Ireland.

Welsh disestablishment was further postponed by the Welsh Church (Temporalities) Act 1919 until 31 March 1920, when it finally went ahead.

United Kingdom Acts of Parliament 1914
September 1914 events
Home rule in Ireland
1914 in Ireland
1914 in Wales
H. H. Asquith